Operation Jaguar may refer to:
Operation Jaguar (Oman), culminating British operation of the Dhofar Rebellion (October 1971)
Operation Jaguar (Croatia), the Croatian capture of Križ Hill during the Battle of the Miljevci Plateau (17–22 May 1992)
Operation Jaguar (Canadian), contribution of military aviation and search-and-rescue capability in support of the Jamaica Defence Force
Operation Jaguar (United Kingdom), Greater Manchester Police investigation on Cyril Smith